Malesherbia scarlatiflora is a shrub native to the pacific slopes of Peru. It grows up to 1 meter tall, has narrow ovate-acuminate leaves, and orange flowers.  

The genetic diversity of the species is average, based on heterozygosity rates across two populations. There is strong evidence of geneflow between different populations. On the basis of low genetic diversity, M. scarlatiflora is currently classified as endangered.

References 

Flora of Peru
Plants described in 1913
scarlatiflora